The British Post Office scandal is a miscarriage of justice involving the wrongful civil and criminal prosecutions of an unknown or unpublished number of sub-postmasters (SPMs) for theft, false accounting and/or fraud. The cases constitute the most widespread miscarriage of justice in British legal history, spanning a period of over twenty years; it remains unresolved. 

After some convicted SPMs successfully sued the Post Office, 555 convictions were declared unsafe and to have been obtained unlawfully. By 2022, 736 prosecutions had been identified, 83 convictions had been overturned and more were expected to be quashed. The number of those affected by other types of abuse by the Post Office, torts, breach of contract, coercion etc., has not been tabulated or published. The prosecutions, civil actions, and extortions resulted in criminal convictions, false confessions, imprisonments, defamation, loss of livelihood, bankruptcy, divorce, and suicide.

In 1996, International Computers Limited (ICL) began working on a computer accounting system, called Horizon, for the publicly-owned Post Office corporation. By 1999, ICL  was part of Fujitsu. In 1999, the problems began with Horizon's introduction, which wrongly detected the existence of financial discrepancies at multiple post office branches. Second Sight's (forensic accountants) report of 2014 described the Horizon Computer System as not fit for purpose, whilst the Post Office stated that "there is absolutely no evidence of any systemic issues with the computer system". The Post Office terminated the Initial Complaint Review and Mediation Scheme in 2015 and published a report clearing themselves of any wrongdoing.

The Post Office has a single shareholder, the British Government. Initially, the government refused to pay any compensation; both the Post Office and government repeatedly stated that the money awarded when the SPMs sued the Post Office was a full and final settlement. After appeals by MPs in 2021, the government promised financial compensation to the victims of the scandal, as the Post Office itself did not have sufficient resources.

The Post Office set up a separate historic shortfall scheme that went on to attract more than 2,400 claims. The scheme excluded the 555 SPMs who had successfully sued the post office. , no commitment to compensate those 555 SPMs existed. On 22 March 2022, a government scheme was launched to compensate the 555 SPMs at the same level of compensation as other SPMs.

In 2020, the government initiated an independent inquiry, led by retired judge Wyn Williams. After two initial hearings, it was converted to a public inquiry in June 2021. In November it held a preliminary 'List of Issues Hearing' and, in February 2022, commenced a series of 'Human Impact Hearings' investigating whether the Post Office and software supplier Fujitsu knew about the faults in the IT system, which led to criminal convictions and civil proceedings against staff, which have subsequently been quashed. The inquiry hopes to be completed by Autumn 2022.

Overview 

In 1999, the UK Post Office, part of Royal Mail, introduced a computer accounting system, Horizon, developed by the Japanese company Fujitsu. From February 2003 to 2010, Royal Mail was under the leadership of Adam Crozier, its CEO. On 1 April 2012, Post Office Ltd became independent of Royal Mail Group, and was reorganised to become a subsidiary of Royal Mail Holdings, with a separate management and board of directors.
 
By 2013, Horizon was used by at least 11,500 branches and was processing some six million transactions every day. From 1999, sub-postmasters (SPMs) began reporting unexplained discrepancies and losses. The Post Office maintained that Horizon was "robust" and that none of the discrepancies were due to Horizon. Some sub-postmasters unwilling or unable to make good the shortfalls were prosecuted by the Post Office for theft, false accounting and fraud. Between 1991 and 2015, there were 918 successful prosecutions. These were largely private prosecutions by the Post Office relying on IT evidence alone, without proof of criminal intent. Public prosecutions also occurred in Scotland, Northern Ireland and in the Crown Court. Some SPMs were persuaded by their own solicitors to plead guilty to false accounting, on being told the Post Office would drop theft charges. Once the Post Office had a criminal conviction, it would attempt to secure a Proceeds of Crime Act order against convicted sub-postmasters, allowing it to seize their assets and bankrupt them. According to press reports, these actions by the Post Office caused the loss of dozens of jobs, bankruptcy, divorce, unwarranted prison sentences and one suicide.

In 2019, the Horizon Issues trial judgment in the Bates & Others v Post Office Ltd group litigation at the High Court found that software errors and defects did exist and that it was possible for these to cause apparent discrepancies or shortfalls in branch accounts or transactions, to undermine the reliability of Horizon accurately to process and to record transactions. Mr Justice Fraser found that this had happened on numerous occasions.

In September 2020, the Post Office declared it would not oppose 44 postmasters' appeals against conviction, but it unsuccessfully opposed their appeals against improper prosecution. In December 2020, six summary jurisdiction convictions were quashed, and in April 2021 the Court of Appeal quashed a further 39 convictions. The court made the rare finding that the Post Office had acted in such a way as to subvert the integrity of the criminal justice system and public confidence in it. The prosecutions were found to be an abuse of process and an affront to the conscience of the court. By this relatively rare finding the appellants were completely exonerated. The BBC called the convictions "the UK's most widespread miscarriage of justice".

In April 2021, Post Office chief executive Nick Read announced that the Horizon system would be replaced with a new cloud-based IT system.

Horizon computer system 

The Horizon computer system cost £1 billion and was designed by ICL/Fujitsu Services.

After a lengthy competitive procurement exercise, begun in 1994, the contract for further development and full implementation in all post offices was awarded in May 1996 to ICL's Pathway division, which had been created for the purpose.

In 1999, four years and £700 million of taxpayers' money after the pilot scheme began, the government, by now Labour, stopped the scheme in its tracks. The Department of Social Security withdrew from the deal, leaving ICL/Fujitsu to run the system. ICL subsequently criticised the PFI payment criterion: it would have been paid partly on how many customers post offices attracted. Stuart Sweetman, the then group managing director of customer and banking services for Consignia (the name used at the time by the then holding company for Post Office Counters Ltd, Parcelforce and Royal Mail), said in 2001: "Looking back, I think it was over-ambitious ... You can't export all the risk to a supplier."

On 8 April 2021, after the problems had caused scandal, Post Office chief executive Nick Read announced that the Horizon system would be replaced by a new IT system that would be "more user-friendly, easier to adapt for new products and services, and cloud-based to ensure easy maintenance and ready interoperability with other systems." He said: "This will not be easy – it will after all be among the biggest, if not the biggest, IT roll-out in the country when the time comes. But the change is both necessary and overdue."

Problems 
Sub-postmasters began to report computer errors to the Post Office within weeks of the Horizon system being installed, via the 'Helpline' the SPMs were instructed to use. The Post Office resisted the SPMs' reports of faults in the system, insisted that the SPMs make up any shortfall of money and, when asked by an SPM, denied that other SPMs had reported problems. In 2000, there were six shortfall convictions that relied on Horizon data. 41 SPMs were prosecuted in 2001, and 64 in 2002. In May 2002, shopkeeper Baljit Sethi raised concerns with the press that there were errors in Horizon, after his wife Anjana Sethi was notified that her SPM contract would be terminated. The Post Office responded that they "totally refuted" that the system was faulty, and that it had "sent experts... to check it twice". In around 2000, problems with the system were reported by Alan Bates, the SPM at Craig-y-Don from March 1998 until November 2003. In 2003, Bates had his contract as SPM terminated when he refused to comply with Post Office policy. He reported his concerns to Computer Weekly in 2004; sufficient evidence had been gathered by 2009 to publish it. A campaign group on the issue, Justice for Sub-postmasters Alliance (JFSA) was formed by Bates and others in September 2009. By 2012, concern in the media, and amongst a number of members of parliament, had grown. As a result, an independent investigative firm, Second Sight, was commissioned by the Post Office to conduct a separate, independent inquiry in 2012. At around this time, Paula Vennells became CEO of the Post Office.

Second Sight reports 

 Interim Report dated 8 July 2013;
 Briefing Report Part One dated 25 July 2014;
 Briefing Report Part Two version 1 dated 21 August 2014;
 Briefing Report Part Two version 2 dated 9 April 2015.

Vennells, who stood down from her Post Office role in 2019, said in 2020, of the 2013 report, that "it concluded, while it had not found evidence of system-wide problems with the Horizon software, there were specific areas where Post Office should consider its procedures and operational support for sub-postmasters." Ron Warmington, of Second Sight had said in 2019 "if the Post Office Board had believed ... and acted on ... what Second Sight reported ... instead of being led by the nose by its own middle management and in-house and external legal advisors, huge amounts of money, and human suffering, would have been avoided." In July 2013, Second Sight issued an interim report and Post Office Ltd admitted that software defects with Horizon had indeed occurred, but said that the system was effective. The review discovered problems in 2011 and 2012, when Post Office Ltd discovered defects that had caused a shortfall of up to £9,000 at 76 Post Office branches. The BBC reported that the Post Office later made good those losses and the SPMs were not held liable. However, more than 150 sub-postmasters continued to raise issues with the system, which they claimed had, by error, put them in debt by tens of thousands of pounds, and that in some cases they lost their contracts or went to prison. In 2019, Warmington said,

Second Sight's report of 9 April 2015, titled Initial Complaint Review and Mediation Scheme and marked as confidential, states that they were first appointed by Post Office at the request of Members of Parliament in July 2012. Undertakings were given by Post Office to satisfy MPs that Second Sight would be able to conduct an independent investigation into the matters of concern. The report described the Horizon system as, in some cases, "not fit for purpose". The lead investigator for Second Sight claimed that there were about 12,000 communication failures every year, with software defects at 76 branches and old and unreliable hardware. The system had, according to the report, not been tracking money from lottery terminals, tax disc sales or cash machines – and the initial Post Office Ltd investigation had not looked for the cause of the errors, instead accusing the SPMs of theft. The report was dismissed by the Post Office. However, it was leaked to the BBC in September 2014. The BBC's article on the report also said that training on the system was not good enough, that "equipment was outdated", and that "power cuts and communication problems made things worse".

In March 2015, Private Eye magazine and other sources reported that Post Office Ltd had ordered Second Sight to end their investigation just one day before the report was due to be published, and to destroy all the paperwork which they had not handed over. Post Office Ltd then scuppered the independent committee set up to oversee the investigation, as well as the mediation scheme for SPMs, and published a report which cleared themselves of any wrongdoing. Of the 136 cases, 56 had been closed, and Post Office Ltd would put the rest forward for "mediation" unless a court ruling prevented them from doing so. After ending the inquiry, Post Office Ltd said that there were no wide-scale problems, and that:

Mediation scheme 
Post Office Ltd then went into mediation with some of the affected SPMs. By December 2014, however, MPs had criticised Post Office Ltd for how it handled the SPMs' claims, and 140 of those affected had withdrawn their support for the Post Office-run mediation scheme. 144 MPs had been contacted by SPMs about the issue, and James Arbuthnot, the MP leading on the matter, accused the organisation of rejecting 90% of applications for mediation. Post Office Ltd said that the claims by Arbuthnot were "regrettable and surprising". Arbuthnot further claimed that Post Office Ltd had been "duplicitous", and said that:

In February 2015, Computerworld UK, a trade magazine for IT managers, reported that Post Office Ltd were obstructing the investigation by refusing to hand over key files to Second Sight. Post Office Ltd (Angela van den Bogerd) claimed in the Business, Energy and Industrial Strategy Committee hearing of 3 February 2015 that they "have been working with Second Sight over the last few weeks on what we agreed at the outset. We have been providing the information", but the lead investigator for Second Sight, when asked by Adrian Bailey MP, if that were the case, said "No, it is not", as he had not been given access to prosecution files, which he needed to back up his suspicions that Post Office Ltd had brought cases against SPMs with "inadequate investigation and inadequate evidence". He said that these files were still outstanding eighteen months after they had been requested. 

Paula Vennells (then Chief Executive, Post Office), subsequently apologised to workers affected by the scandal, saying: "I am truly sorry we were unable to find both a solution and a resolution outside of litigation and for the distress this caused." Her letter to the Energy and Industrial Strategy Select Committee claims "The message that the Board and I were consistently given by Fujitsu, from the highest levels of the company, was that while, like any IT system, Horizon was not perfect and had a limited life-span, it was fundamentally sound" (Answer 11). She claims "I raised this question repeatedly, both internally and with Fujitsu, and was always given the same answer: that it was not possible for branch records to be altered remotely without the sub-postmaster's knowledge. Indeed, I remember being told by Fujitsu's then CEO when I raised it with him that the system was "like Fort Knox" (Answer 54).

Court cases 

The Post Office proceeded aggressively against its staff in criminal prosecutions in magistrates' courts and the Crown Court and with civil actions. At the time of the prosecutions, the Post Office had no different standing in law to that of any other private prosecutor in the British legal system. It acted as a private prosecutor in England and Wales. In Scotland, it reported allegations of crime to a procurator fiscal, and in Northern Ireland to the Public Prosecution Service. However, The Post Office's unique position, with a history as a prosecutor going back to 1683, gave the Criminal Cases Review Committee the greatest cause for concern upon its referral to the Court of Appeal. Historically Royal Mail had been a public authority.

The Post Office is not a typical private prosecutor. The Private Prosecutors' Association question whether the Post Office was conducting private prosecutions at all and was in fact a "publicly-owned entity and a public prosecutor" during the relevant period. The Criminal Cases Review Commission (CCRC), in its written submission to the Commons Select Committee, questioned whether any organisation with the Post Office's combined status, as victim, investigator and prosecutor, would be able to take decisions on investigations and disclosure "appropriately free from conflict of interest and conscious or unconscious bias". Counsel for the defence in the case of Misra raised the issues of insufficient disclosure, conflict of interest, etc.

Paul Marshall, counsel to three appellants in the case of Hamilton, until forced to resign from the case by an allegation by the Post Office of contempt, or information to the court indicating contempt, or breach of disclosure terms, in written evidence to the parliamentary Justice Committee, rejected the notion of the private nature of the prosecutions as a single cause of the scandal. The Scottish Criminal Cases Review Commission has written to some 73 SPMs who may have been wrongly prosecuted and/or convicted. Marshall postulated four inter-related causes:
 Legallegislative failure.
 Legalcourt/judicial failure.
 Post Office mendacity/opportunism.
 Failure in Post Office corporate governance.
As the mediation process broke down, the affected SPMs began to consult and combine their efforts into legal action. The action taken against the Post Office took the form first of the Group Litigation in the name of Bates and others, a civil action in the High Court by some 600 people, and the linked appeal cases, first of R v Christoper Trousdale & Others in the Crown Court, and then of Hamilton and Others in the Court of Appeal (Criminal Division). In the Trousdale and Hamilton appeals, the findings in the civil case (Bates) were used to support the appeals against convictions. In Bates, six 'lead claimants' and 23 'Common Issues' were identified and agreed to enable the court to examine the 600 cases. The court of appeal judgment, that all of the successful appeals had suffered a prosecution that was "an affront to the conscience of the court", has important implications for any future civil cases against the Post Office.

Further cases since the Hamilton appeal have been heard and further appeals and civil claims are expected. The Financial Times headlined "Sub-postmasters set to file UK lawsuits for malicious prosecution".  83 people have had their convictions quashed and the CCRC is calling on more subpostmasters to come forward to have their convictions reviewed.

Magistrates' courts 

Magistrates' courts are not courts of record. An appeal from a conviction in a magistrates' court is by way of case stated to a higher court, usually to the Crown Court. , the number of convictions obtained by the Post Office, directly or via public prosecution in magistrates' courts is unknown or unpublished.

On 30 June 2021, the Post Office issued a statement that, inter alia, said:

Crown Court

R v Christopher Trousdale & Others – December 2020 

The first subpostmaster appeals against convictions were at Southwark Crown Court before Circuit Judge Taylor, sitting as a deputy judge of the High Court. The cases were from magistrates' court convictions in London, Luton, Basingstoke, Oxford, Burton-upon-Trent, and Scarborough between 2004 and 2012. "The Post Office is currently reviewing around 800 prosecutions made between 1999 and 2014, where Horizon data was used in evidence." The six appealed against their convictions. The appeals were unopposed; the respondent, the Post Office, offered no evidence, the appeals were allowed and Not Guilty verdicts were entered. Little if any mention was made of the distinction between unsafe convictions and prosecutions that should not have been brought.

This case was heard before submissions about ultra vires or wrongful prosecutions were made in Hamilton & Others. Just three months later, it was known publicly that these submissions were to be made and that the Post Office intended to oppose them in Hamilton. Five of the six appellants were represented by counsel – one was unrepresented and had been advised by the court that she need not attend. Costs were awarded to the appellants. At the end of the hearing the judge said, "I am sure that all of the appellants are grateful for the approach that the Post Office has taken finally to this matter and that it can be put to rest for them."

R v Seema Misra – October 2010 
Seema Misra was prosecuted and sentenced to imprisonment at Guildford Crown Court. In written evidence to Parliament's Justice Committee, the barrister who had started her representation at her appeal in the Hamilton case said, that at "Mrs Misra's criminal trial, on ... three separate occasions, the defence applied to three separate judges to have the prosecution stopped on the basis that the disclosure given by the Post Office was woefully inadequate and the prosecution an abuse of process..." The submissions at Guildford Crown Court were dismissed and Ms Misra was charged with one count of theft, to which she pleaded not guilty, and six of false accounting to which she pleaded guilty.

In a further application, during the trial, that the trial be stopped, Mr Hadrill, for Mrs Misra, said of the prosecution's expert witness, "He operates under a restriction because he is an employee of Fujitsu who are under contract to the Post Office and he can only comply with his contractual terms as best he can and there is no suggestion his integrity is anywhere at fault as to what he is permitted to do, bearing in mind this is a Post Office prosecution. I don't go behind that but it is not an independent prosecution at arm's reach from the loser company and Mr Jenkins, so we have to have concerns as to the quality of his evidence and the best he has done in regard to the restrictions he operates under." The application was again unsuccessful. The prosecution told the jury, "In a Post Office case it is a Post Office investigator who conducts the interview because of course they are familiar with Post Office procedures in a way a Police Officer would not necessarily be."

Mrs Misra, recalling the moment when she was sentenced to 15 months in prison in 2010, said, "It's hard to say but I think that if I had not been pregnant, I would have killed myself."

High Court

Post Office Ltd v Castleton – January 2006 

This was a civil case in which the Post Office sued Mr Castleton. The case was heard before Judge Richard Havery QC in December 2006 and January 2007. The defendant represented himself and counterclaimed damages in the sum of £11,250 on the ground that the Post Office wrongfully determined the contract as a subpostmaster following his suspension. The judge found for the Post Office on the claim for £25,858.95. He found the deficiencies were real, the business was not properly managed and that Mr. Castleton was therefore in breach of his contract with the Post Office. "Moreover, the losses must have been caused by his own error or that of his assistants. The counterclaim was dismissed." Unable to afford the losses and the £321,000 in legal costs, Mr. Castleton declared himself bankrupt.

Bates & Others v Post Office Ltd 

On 22 March 2017, Senior Master Fontaine made a group litigation order with the approval of the President of the Queen's Bench of the High Court and, on 31 March, Fraser J was nominated managing judge in Bates & Others v Post Office Ltd, brought by approximately 600 claimants. At the start of the proceedings, the Post Office unsuccessfully opposed the making or the existence of a GLO. The Post Office had set up a litigation sub-committee, attended on 24 April 2019 by Tim Parker, Tom Cooper, (director of UK Government Investments), David Cavender QC, Alisdair Cameron, Ben Foat, staff from Womble Bond Dickinson and from Herbert Smith Freehills. There was an unsuccessful application by the Post Office that the judge recuse himself, an appeal, and two separate submissions described by judges as attempts to put the courts in terrorem. At the Judgment No. 6 the judge said:

The SPMs were financed by a litigation fund, Therium. High court battles are expensive. Defendants try to intimidate funders by running up costs and with delaying tactics, in the hope the latter might walk. The matter ended by consent when the Post Office agreed to pay costs of £58 million, without admitting liability, and compensation was therefore not awarded. Of that payment, £46 million went to the financial backers.

The extent to which the government was aware of the Post Office's approach to its defence was questioned during the parliamentary debate on 19 March 2020. David Jones MP said, "Of course the Post Office has a non-executive director appointed by the Government. One must assume that that non-executive director is reporting to Ministers." Kevin Jones MP replied, "If I had been the Minister, I would have had that person in and scrutinised what was going on ... That would certainly have applied in the past few months, given the hundreds of millions of pounds that have been spent defending the indefensible." Bambos Charalambous MP said, "The Post Office seemed to have unlimited funds at its disposal to fight this action, ... The Post Office is an arm's length organisation, but there seems to be no accountability ..." Chi Onwurah MP said, "Its only shareholder is the Secretary of State for Business, Energy and Industrial Strategy, so more should have been done to address the scandal before it was allowed to fester to this extent."

Arbuthnot, sitting in the House of Lords as Baron Arbuthnot of Edrom, in a written question asked, "... whether the Accounting Officer with responsibility for the Post Office has played any role in advising ministers on the Government's policy in relation to ... (3) the sub-postmasters' litigation against the Post Office". In an article headed "Did government officials collude in trying to remove a judge?" journalist Nick Wallis sets out and assesses the government's reply to Arbuthnot's questions, "Mr Chisholm (Principal Accounting Officer at BEIS) has never been held to account for his actions in monitoring or blessing the Post Office's behaviour since he was appointed BEIS Permanent Secretary in 2016. We don't know what he advised ministers about the progress of the litigation or the post-Common Issues "changes" to "strategy".

During the case, six separate judgments were handed down:

Judgment No 1 Applications to alter timetable – November 2017 

Referring to costs and delay, the judge said, "Fitting hearings around their availability has all the disadvantages of doing an intricate jigsaw puzzle, with none of the fun associated with that activity."

Judgment No 2 Application to strike out evidence – October 2018 

This decision followed a case management hearing and dismissed an application to strike out roughly one-quarter of the lead claimants' evidence – more than 160 paragraphs. The judge commented that adverse publicity for Post Office was not a matter of concern for the court if the evidence was relevant and admissible. He also warned against the aggressive conduct of litigation, particularly in a group action of this nature.

In the judgment in the Court of Appeal refusing permission to appeal the recusal application, Lord Justice Coulson said that the SPMs had submitted "that the strike-out application arose because the PO wished to adduce extensive factual evidence in their favour but objected to any evidence to the contrary from the SPMs. As they put it 'the Post Office wanted the case decided all one way'. There remains a distinct flavour of that approach within the recusal application." "The application by the defendant to strike out this evidence appears to be an attempt to hollow out the Lead Claimants' case to the very barest of bones (to mix metaphors), if not beyond, and to keep evidence with which the defendant does not agree from being aired at all." Counsel for the SPMs, in a written submission that was quoted and accepted by the judge, said the application "appears to be an attempt by Post Office to secure an advantage at the Common Issues Trial by selectively tailoring the evidence which the Court is to consider."

The application was dismissed.

Judgment No 3 Common Issues – March 2019 

The sub-postmasters and the Post Office had identified 23 issues relating to the contractual relationship between them and about which they disagreed. The judge made findings on each so that obligations under all iterations of the contracts would be settled, both retrospectively and prospectively. Of the 23 issues, 16 were decided in the SPMs favour. The parties agreed that broadly the claimants were more successful. Issue 1 was later described by the judge as important. He found Subpostmasters' contracts are relational contracts. "This means that the Post Office is not entitled to act in a way that would be considered commercially unacceptable by reasonable and honest people."

In court, Fraser criticised testimony given by Post Office witnesses. The judge said Angela van den Bogerd (Head of Partnerships, Post Office) "did not give me frank evidence, and sought to obfuscate matters, and mislead me." Fraser commented on the evidence given by Stephen Parker, Head of Post Office Application Support, Fujitsu:

Of the evidence of one Post Office witness, the judge said, "The Post Office appears, at least at times, to conduct itself as though it is answerable only to itself. The statement that it is prepared to preserve documents – as though that were a concession – and the obdurate to accept the relevance of plainly important documents, and to refuse to produce them, is extremely worrying." Fraser said in the Horizon Issues trial,

When the judgment was delivered, the Post Office said it would appeal. On 23 May, the judge refused the Post Office permission to appeal and set out his reasons on 17 June. The Post Office applied for permission to appeal that refusal. However, during the Horizon Issues evidence, just as the judge returned to court for the final afternoon, Joshua Rozenberg reported, "he was told that the Post Office had served an application for his recusal ... Counsel representing Post Office on the Horizon issues had apparently not seen it. He made no mention of it that morning".

Judgment No 4 Application for recusal – April 2019 

The Post Office brought in Lord Grabiner QC to make an application to Fraser J that he recuse himself. Grabiner is widely described as a 'legal heavyweight'. Statements supporting the recusal application alleged that paragraphs 22 to 25 of Judgment No 3 were findings, or observations that fell outside the scope of the Common Issues trial. Paragraph 24 of that judgment gave the clear impression that the judge has already formed a firm view on these matters that will prevent him from taking an impartial view when they are revisited at subsequent trials. The statement further alleged that the judgment contained critical invective directed at the Post Office and that parts harshly criticised the Post Office's witnesses on irrelevant matters. The SPMs argued that the Post Office was insufficiently specific and the judge required the Post Office to identify the relevant paragraphs of Judgment No 3. In response, the Post Office cited 110 different paragraphs.

The recusal application was dismissed on two grounds, no bias, and waiver due to delay by the Post Office. Lord Grabiner had been asked to explain the delay in making the application. He replied "It was made at board level within the client and it also involved the need for me to be got up to speed from a standing start. And I am not the only judicial figure or barrister that has looked at this with a view to reaching that conclusion. It has also been looked at by another very senior person before the decision was taken to make this application. The delay, such as it is, is very, very tiny". This submission was rejected. The judge decided the issue of waiver as a result of the delay in making the application for recusal.

The recusal application was opposed by the SPMs and dismissed by the judge.

Judgment No 5 Common Issues costs – June 2019 

The issuing by the Post Office of the recusal application on 21 March 2019 caused significant disruption to the Horizon Issues trial which had started on 11 March 2019, and to the Group Litigation as a whole. The SPMs applied for the costs of that application; the Post Office sought that the judge reserve costs, in the following terms

The judge was troubled by this submission. Inherent was a veiled or implied threat that the Post Office will say that the overall outcome of the litigation, or other future issues, has been decided. The Post Office was attempting to put the court in terrorem again. After asserting no predecision he said, "I do nonetheless consider that it is appropriate that I consider whether to make a costs order now ... " After considering cases cited the application by the Post Office to reserve costs was dismissed. "The claimants would not be on an equal footing with the Post Office, a publicly funded body, if I reserved the costs of the Common Issues trial until the very end of the litigation ... I do not however consider that the presence of litigation funding should sway this decision one way or the other. I agree with Mr Cavender that the presence of such funding should not put a claimant in a better position vis-à-vis the correct stage in litigation at which costs should be addressed, compared to a non-funded party. However, regardless of who is funding litigation, a funder or an individual litigant, cash flow is a relevant consideration for most litigants. It is a consideration that might weigh less heavily upon publicly funded bodies such as the Post Office, but even such entities are likely to be concerned to some extent with cash flow." Of the SPMs submissions that their award of costs should not be reduced, the court rejected them.

Judgment No 6 Horizon issues – December 2019 

This judgment concerns the operation and functionality of the Horizon system itself. The hearings took place in March, April, June and July 2019. The hearings were interrupted by the Post Office's application for the judge to recuse, to appeal his refusal to recuse (judgment 4), and his judgment 3. The judgment was published in December 2019. Twenty-nine bugs, errors and defects were identified and analysed. Witnesses for the SPMs and for the Post Office submitted statements and gave oral evidence. Documents that had been submitted, and further documents, the submission of which had been resisted were, after argument and rulings, submitted. These included the 'Known Error Logs' and the 'PEAKs', a browser-based software incident and problem management system used by Fujitsu for the Post Office account. Permission, for two IT experts to be called, one for the claimants (Mr Coyne) and one for the Post Office (Dr Worden)

During this trial, the Post Office issued an application that the judge recuse himself. That led first to Fraser J's Judgment No. 4, and then to an application for permission to appeal that judgment. The applications and the appeal failed but caused considerable delay.

Court of Appeal (civil)

Permission to appeal Judgment No 3 – November 2019 

Lord Justice Coulson refused permission to appeal judgment No 3 and handed down his written reasons on 22 November. Before dealing with the 26 grounds that formed the basis of the application the judge set out a number of reasons that he felt militated against granting the Post Office permission to appeal. In short, the judge said:
 The trial was long and complex – 6 weeks – 60 lever arch files – 20 witnesses of fact. The judgment is 320 pages and 1,122 paragraphs long. No judge will ever know more about this case generally, and the Common Issues specifically, than Fraser J. 
 The oral hearing of the permission-to-appeal application had demonstrated the danger that consideration of one issue opened up another, and another until the trial is re-fought. That is manifestly not in the interests of justice. 
 Many of the Post Office's challenges are challenges to the findings of fact made by Fraser J. Challenges to such findings of fact are not open to an appellant in the position of the Post Office. Fraser J's conclusions of law were so entangled with his findings of fact that Coulson LJ considered it neither just, nor practicable to endeavour to separate them out. 
 The Post Office made sweeping statements of the judgment which were demonstrably wrong. The Post Office takes findings "either wholly out of context, misstated, or otherwise not correctly summarised". 
 Fraser J dealt comprehensively with why he refused permission to appeal in his separate judgment of 17 June 2019 which itself runs to 91 paragraphs, and Coulson LJ said that he agreed with Fraser J's detailed reasons for refusing the application to appeal.
 The Post Office's approach in this application was, as Fraser J correctly labelled it "attritional". The most obvious example is the Post Office's anxiety to state what they do not like about a particular proposal from the SPMs or the consequential finding by Fraser J, without providing any practical alternative. None of this engenders any confidence in the underlying merits or prospects of success of the Post Office's application for permission to appeal. 
 There is no greater or wider right to permission to appeal just because this is group litigation; indeed, from the point of view of practical justice the opposite may well be the case. In any event, the SPMC was no longer in use. 
 This application is founded on the premise that the nation's most trusted brand was not obliged to treat their SPMs with good faith, and instead entitled to treat them in capricious or arbitrary ways which would not be unfamiliar to a mid-Victorian factory-owner (the Post Office's right to terminate contracts arbitrarily and the SPMs alleged strict liability to the Post Office for errors made by the Post Office's own computer system, being just two of many examples). Given the unique relationship that the Post Office has with its SPMs, that position was a startling starting point for any consideration of these grounds of appeal.

The application was refused.

Permission to appeal Judgment No 4 – May 2019 

Lord Justice Coulson refused the Post Office permission to appeal the refusal to recuse. Of the submission by Lord Grabiner, that he was not the only judicial figure or barrister that had looked at the decision to seek recusal, Coulson said at paragraph 48: "Such a comment, presumably made in terrorem, should not have been made at least without proper explanation of its relevance." In her legal analysis of the case Kate Beaumont said, "Recusal applications are extremely serious. They are not a tactic to be strategically deployed by a losing party." She quotes Coulson as saying "Without making any finding, he stated that he at least understood the claimants' submission that the recusal application and the permission to appeal application were made in an attempt to de-rail the litigation as a whole."

The application was refused.

Court of Appeal (criminal) 

In March 2020 the Criminal Cases Review Commission (CCRC) referred for appeal the convictions of 39 Post Office applicants. The commission said it would be referring all those cases, which involve convictions for theft, fraud and false accounting, on the basis that each prosecution amounted to an abuse of process. In May 2020 the CCRC referred a further eight such convictions, bringing the total to 47. In January 2021 the CCRC decided to refer a further four convictions, bringing the total to 51. In May 2021 Helen Pitcher, chair of the commission, told MPs that the organisation was 'not adequately resourced' if 200 cases were to be brought forward for review. She told the justice committee that a shortage of case review managers would take months to address, and that talks are ongoing with the Ministry of Justice about extending funding.

Hamilton & Others and Post Office Ltd – April 2021 

In April 2021, after an appeal before three judges, Lord Justice Holroyde, Mr Justice Picken and Mrs Justice Farbey, thirty-nine of the convicted former postmasters had their convictions quashed, with a further twenty-two cases still being investigated by the Criminal Cases Review Commission.

At the commencement of the case, three of the applicant SPMs were represented by Paul Marshall and Flora Page, his junior. In December 2020, Marshall and Page resigned from the case under threat from the court of contempt proceedings. That threat was lifted at a hearing in April 2021 before Lord Justice Fulford. It was Marshall and Page who led the charge on the critical second limb of the appeal, that it was an "affront to the public conscience for the appellants to face prosecution."

Forty-two historic convictions of dishonesty were referred by the Criminal Cases Review Commission (CCRC) to the Court of Appeal. "The CCRC referred the cases because it considered that two cogent lines of argument in relation to abuse of process were available to each appellant: first, that the reliability of Horizon data was essential to the prosecution and conviction, and it was not possible for the trial process to be fair; and secondly, that it was an affront to the public conscience for the appellant to face criminal proceedings." Each of the forty-two cases was considered individually. Of the forty-two, just two had previously appealed, unsuccessfully.

The Post Office accepted Fraser's findings of the unreliability of the Horizon systems and, in some cases, of inadequate investigation, and/or of insufficient disclosure. In these cases, the Post Office did not resist the appeal on Ground 1 but it would oppose Ground 2. The Post Office divided the appellants into three groups; A, 4 cases where it asserted that both categories 1 and 2 abuse of process applied, group B, 35 cases where category 1 applied, but not category 2, and group C, where neither category applied. The Post Office would not seek a retrial of any appellant whose appeal is allowed.

At paragraphs 79 and 80 of the substantive Hamilton judgment, the court referred to a directions hearing on 18 November. That hearing led to further hearings in November, December, and January. The court addressed three issues: 

 information from Brian Altman QC, counsel for Post Office, alleging potential contempt of court by Ms Page, junior counsel for three appellants (all in group B), by improper disclosure of the 'Clarke advice';
 "the issue of whether an appellant whose appeal was not resisted by POL on Ground 1 was entitled to argue Ground 2;"
 an application by journalist Nick Wallis for the release of the 'Clarke advice'. Mr Wallis' application failed.

Mr Altman's information to the court on 19 November led to hearings on 3 December 10 December and 15 January before the present court, and to Marshall and Page resigning from the case. On 3 December, Altman said, "I am confident that the court understands why we brought these matters to the court's attention. ... For the avoidance of any doubt, I should like to make clear that the Post Office has not made application for anyone's committal for contempt. ... We have sought to assist the court as we were invited to do," referring to signed undertakings, "... the court suggested that all legal representatives sign an express undertaking not to use disclosed material other than for the proper conduct of these proceedings." Lord Justice Holroyde interjected, "I thought you suggested that," and Altman replied, "Ultimately, my Lord, I think it was at the suggestion of the court but that is what has happened and that is what has been done."

The court issued a brief judgment. "... we direct that the question of whether any contempt proceedings are to be initiated against Mr Marshall and/or Miss Page and, if so, whether by the Post Office or by the Court of its own initiative, must be adjourned for consideration after the appeals have been concluded. ... we direct that all further hearings must be before a different constitution." On 15 January 2021, the court set out its reasons. It led to Marshall and Page facing the possibility of an action against them, either by the court or by the Post office, for contempt of court. By 4 December, barristers Paul Marshall and Fiona Page had resigned from the Hamilton case. Mr Marshall had written two letters to the court. Of the second, Nick Wallis said, "It makes for troubling reading." In April 2021, the matter came before Lord Justice Fulford, Mrs Justice Cutts and Mr Justice Saini when it was declared no further action to be taken. Mr Marshall said "the threat of contempt proceedings from the outset was seriously questionable as a matter of law".

The Attorney General instructed counsel as advocate to the court, Marshall and Page were succeeded by Ms L. Busch QC and Dr S. Fowles, and the court addressed "the issue of whether an appellant whose appeal was not resisted by the Post Office on Ground 1 was entitled to argue Ground 2." All counsel at the December hearing agreed that no appellant is entitled as of right to argue Ground 2. An earlier written submission to the contrary was not pursued. However, Ms Busch and Dr Fowles went on to argue that "... the court must act judicially. It would be wrong in principle for the court to permit the respondent (the Post Office) effectively to preclude argument on Ground 2 by its concession that Ground 1 is not opposed. ... The appellants have suffered very severely as a consequence of their prosecutions, and a finding in their favour on Ground 1 alone would not fully vindicate them. ... She (Ms Busch) pointed out that there has been an important disclosure since the Commission referred the cases, and submitted that the public interest required consideration of the complete picture."

For the other applicants, it was submitted all were concerned about delay; only three of the whole group had actively sought to argue Ground 2 ... appellants would be content to have their appeals allowed on Ground 1 alone ... however, appellants do contend that Ground 2 is made out in their cases ... if the court concluded that argument should be heard on Ground 2, they would wish their submissions on Ground 2 heard.

The court ordered that, "... in the exercise of the court's discretion we would permit argument on Ground 2 by any appellant who wished to advance it. In the event, each appellant did wish to do so." The court set out its reasoning and highlighted four factors of particular importance:
 abuse of court process is an important matter to the parties and the public, notwithstanding that the appellants had not previously applied for leave to appeal.
 Ground 1 presupposes that there should be a prosecution. The public may legitimately feel ... that a finding in the appellant's favour on Ground 2 adds materially to a finding in his or her favour on Ground 1. ... If in fact an appellant should never have been prosecuted at all, ... the court should make that determination. 
 We are ... satisfied that case management can avoid any risk of these appeals becoming an open-ended exercise in finding facts.
 Fourthly, we do not accept the submissions that consideration of Ground 2 will cause undue delay in the determination of these appeals.

At the April hearings, after considering the submissions of the SPMs and the Post Office, the court stated, "In those circumstances, we are satisfied that a fair trial was not possible in any of the “Horizon cases” and that Ground 1 accordingly succeeds in each of those cases." The court then set out its reasoning in respect of Ground 2. In short, the court decided that Ground 2 succeeds in each of the "Horizon cases".

The Clarke advice 
The 'Clarke Advice' consists of two pieces of advice to the Post Office in 2013 by a barrister working for Cartwright King (CK), a solicitors’ firm instructed in relation to the Post Office prosecutions. This document led to the "CK Sift Review" and the "Brian Altman General Review". The Sift review "raised the prospect of at least 26 potential miscarriages of justice and caused the immediate cessation of 4 prosecutions. It was concluded in 2014." It was disclosed in the Hamilton appeals in November 2020 by the Post Office amongst a bundle of post prosecution disclosures at the request of Aria Grace Law, the solicitors for three appellants in November, and was described by Lord Falconer, former head of the judiciary, as a likely "smoking gun".

The Clarke Advice had not been disclosed to the CCRC prior to its referral of the SPMs' cases to the Court of Appeal. Paul Marshall said, "The Court of Appeal elicited acceptance that the provision of the Clarke Advice was an 'error of judgment' and that being done it was determined no further action was to be taken. ... the 'Clarke Advice' was pivotal in the Court of Appeal's finding that ... the Post Office was engaged in conduct that constituted an abuse of the process of the court and calculated to subvert the integrity of the criminal justice system or undermine public confidence in it. Its disclosure resulted in the much later disclosure of the 'shredding' Clarke advice."

Aftermath
The Communication Workers' Union called for Vennells' appointment as a Commander of the Order of the British Empire (CBE), in the 2019 New Year Honours for "services to the Post Office and to charity", to be rescinded. In April 2021, after the overturning of the thirty-nine convictions, Vennells resigned as a director of Dunelm and Morrisons and as an associate Church of England minister.

Inquiries 

On 26 February 2020, Prime Minister Boris Johnson committed to hold an independent inquiry. Evidence about the case was also heard by Parliament's Business, Energy and Industrial Strategy Committee on 10 March 2020. On 19 March 2020, in a debate in the House of Commons, Kevan Jones MP criticized former Post Office CEO, Paula Vennells, for her role in the scandal. Arbuthnot said in November 2019:

In a written ministerial statement on 10 June 2020, Paul Scully, Minister for Small Business, Consumers and Labour Markets, announced the scope of the Independent Review into the Post Office Horizon IT System and Trials. Of the review's terms of reference, Lord Arbuthnot said in the Lord's chamber on 6 October, "Yet the Government are expressly excluding from the scope of their inquiry the Post Office Ltd prosecution function, the Horizon group damages settlement and the conduct of current or future litigation. ... why have the Government excluded these most important things?" The minister replied the settlement agreed in December was full and final and therefore excluded from the scope of the inquiry ... the Post Office is not conducting any private prosecutions and has no plans to do so ... only the courts can decide on criminal matters, such as whether to overturn the postmasters’ convictions, so it would not be appropriate for the inquiry to look at these questions, especially when the court process is still ongoing.

The non-statutory inquiry, now titled The Post Office Horizon IT Inquiry by the government and led by Sir Wyn Williams, began work in Autumn 2020 and issued a call for evidence on 1 December 2020. The first public hearing session took place on 15 January 2021. The Justice For Sub-postmasters Alliance (JFSA) refused to take part in the inquiry, described it as a whitewash and called for a full public inquiry.

Dr Neil Hudgell, of solicitors for SPMs said, "Now Post Office officials must face criminal investigation for maliciously ruining lives by prosecuting innocent people in pursuit of profits," and called for the prime minister to convene a judge-led inquiry. After the SPM's successful appeals on both grounds 1 and 2 abuse of process, in an article headed "Calls grow for SRA and police to investigate Post Office lawyers", Hudgell is quoted as saying the Post Office engaged in "legal gymnastics to seek to persuade the court away from finding a clear systematic abuse of process of the criminal law." In the same article, Richard Moorhead, professor of law and professional ethics at Exeter Law School, said "the SRA and BSB should investigate whether anyone should be held to account amid professional concerns about who was responsible for disclosure issues." Solicitors for SPMs wrote to the government (DBEIS) asking it to re-establish the inquiry on a statutory footing and to consult again on the terms of reference. "The department should be called as witnesses under oath, not have effective control of the inquiry," ... "The Post Office wrongly prosecuted so many upstanding pillars of the community and its owners want to mark (their) own homework – that is unconscionable."

On 19 May 2021, the government announced that an extended, statutory inquiry into the computer scandal would deliver its conclusions in autumn 2022. Witnesses could now be compelled to give evidence. Mr Scully said he and Sir Wyn had agreed that the context of the events had changed after convictions were quashed and hundreds more were expected to follow. Boris Johnson said:

The University of Exeter commenced a research project into the events surrounding the Bates and Hamilton cases.

Statutory inquiry 

On 19 May 2021 Wyn Williams said that in the following weeks, the inquiry would produce a statement of approach and that, in September 2021, a further statement of approach would set out all relevant details.

On 28 July, the government (DBEIS) issued its fourth statement of approach, which included the inquiry terms of reference. After setting out preliminary and organisational matters – the appointment of solicitors and counsel to the inquiry – establishment of a website and of premises, etc., the statement set out terms of reference, in essence:
 
A: Understand and acknowledge what went wrong and key lessons that must be learned.
B: Obtain all available relevant evidence from the Post Office, Fujitsu, BEIS and UKGI to establish the failings of Horizon and the Post Office's use of information from Horizon.
C: Assess whether the Post Office has learned and has delivered or made good progress on the changes necessary.
D: Assess whether the commitments made by Post Office Ltd have been properly delivered.
E: Assess whether processes and information provided by the Post Office to postmasters are sufficient.
F: Examine the historic and current governance and whistleblowing controls are now sufficient to ensure that these failures do not happen again.

During the non-statutory inquiry two public hearings were held in early 2021. A preliminary hearing on the provisional List of Issues was held on 8 November 2021. The 'Human Impact Hearings' opened on 14 February 2022, at Juxon House, in the City of London, expected to continue for most of the year. It is being streamed online. The Phase 2 hearings, covering the Horizon IT System procurement, design, pilot, roll out and modifications, are scheduled to start in the week commencing 10 October 2022.

Richard Moorhead, Professor of Law and Professional Ethics, University of Exeter, made written and oral submissions to the Williams inquiry. Moorhead, in an oral submission to the Williams inquiry, said

Immediately after the November hearing, Williams said he would ask Post Office Limited, IT supplier Fujitsu, the Department for Business, Energy & Industrial Strategy and the UK government to 'waive privilege’ in respect of material relevant to the inquiry's terms of reference, and he set a deadline for response. On 16 November, Wyn Williams reported that all four parties had responded within the timescale specified and added "The response of POL, on any view, goes a very long way towards meeting the request I made of them. It is clear to me that in respect of many of the most crucial lines of investigation for the Inquiry POL has waived legal professional privilege." The Post Office published its response to the request on 15 November 2021. Government (BEIS) said that it was its "firm position that the inquiry should not be obstructed by the assertion of legal privilege", but the government-owned Post Office was more cautious. It agreed to a limited waiver over relevant material but would maintain privilege over documents relevant to ongoing litigation/remediation activities. The Post Office maintained privilege over documents relevant to the ongoing group litigation claim in the Employment Tribunal. It maintained privilege over legal advice related to the Historical Shortfall Scheme and to current and anticipated claims from individuals whose criminal convictions have been or will be quashed. This could have wide-reaching ramifications for the inquiry; if advice is withheld on the basis that it is relevant to current and anticipated claims from those who have had their convictions quashed, this may lead to gaps in the inquiry.

On 13 February 2022, in a report prior to the start of the Wyn Williams hearings, the BBC quoted a prosecuted, jailed and subsequently cleared Sub-Post Master, "I want someone else to be charged and jailed like I was.", this request was later repeated by several other SPMs.

Exeter research project 

The research plans:
 To identify and analyse corporate and institutional failure, professional ethics failures, and systematic problems in the criminal justice system.
 Provide a submission to the Williams Inquiry and to lawyers’ professional regulators.
 To suggest areas of reform for criminal justice, professional regulation, corporate governance, and governmental accountability.
 To work on how to change the behaviours and cultures that led to such injustice.

Working Paper I has examined the conduct of the Bates litigation.
 "This paper reveals wide and deep concerns about the conduct of the Bates litigation by POL ... and their lawyers."
 "Whether the breaches of CPR suggested by Fraser J's judgment were accidental, negligent, reckless or deliberate and who is responsible for such flaws needs investigation."
 "Accountability for the strategy, and operationalisation of that strategy, should not be allowed to rest unscrutinised behind legal professional privilege nor need it do so should professional regulators investigate adequately. One reason is the significant potential for professional misconduct charges to flow against a number of the lawyers involved in this case."

The report of the Exeter research project had been critical of the legal work connected with the civil case by the SPMs against the Post Office. The terms of reference of the statutory inquiry and the inquiry's 'themes', circulated on 12 October 2021, "left it unclear as to whether the Post Office's conduct of the Bates group litigation falls within the terms of reference of the Inquiry. It is surprising, and perhaps unsatisfactory, that this should be a matter of uncertainty or doubt." Lawyers acting for the government sought to prevent the Post Office scandal inquiry from looking into the role of legal advisers.

Possible legal action against the PO and others
In December 2019, The Register, in an article titled "Post Office faces potential criminal probe over Fujitsu IT system's accounting failures", reported that Mr Justice Fraser would be passing a file on to the Director of Public Prosecutions. A number of cases are under review by the Criminal Cases Review Commission, raising the possibility of civil actions for malicious prosecution.

In June 2021, a press release by solicitors Rosenblatt referred to the BBC Radio 4 series 'The Great Post Office Trial' in which the former legal adviser to the Post Office noted that "everyone involved in the prosecution process has a duty to comply with the rules, and a deliberate failure to comply with the rules usually amounts to a perversion of the course of justice. I can probably name half a dozen people, with hindsight, who should be very worried."

Compensation 
Sub-Postmasters in Bates & Others v Post Office announced on 11 December 2019 that they had reached an out of court settlement with the Post Office. The Post Office did not accept liability so this was a costs settlement, not compensation. The details of the settlement were not made public until August 2020. At the time of the high court verdict, the government decided this group could not apply for compensation through the historical shortfall scheme. The group that brought the legal action was awarded £57.75m, but some £46m was taken in legal costs, leaving only about £20,000 for each person, which MPs said the victims saw as "inadequate".

Speaking in April 2021, Nick Read, the Post Office chief executive, urged the government to provide funding for compensation. "The Post Office simply does not have the financial resources to provide meaningful compensation," he said. "I completely understand that government is keen that Post Office should be seen to be fixing its own mess – and through the work being undertaken across the business every day to place the needs and interests of postmasters first, we are doing just that. ... But financial compensation commensurate with wrongful conviction is a different matter. ... I am urging government to work with us to find a way of ensuring that the funding needed for such compensation, along with the means to get it to those to whom it may become owed, is arranged as quickly and efficiently as possible." Shortly afterwards the government promised "fair and speedy" pay-outs for the 555 victims of the Horizon IT scandal who had been excluded from the Post Office's compensation scheme. 

In July 2021 government announced that Sub-Postmasters wrongly convicted of offences would get interim compensation of up to £100,000.

Call for reform on digital evidence
In May 2021, the British Computer Society (the official body for IT professionals in the UK) called for reconsideration of courts' default presumption that computer data is correct.

The presumption that computer evidence is correct is based on a naïve and simplistic understanding of software systems. Large systems are complex and lay people cannot discern whether these systems are reliable or be confident that they can spot errors as they happen. It is difficult even for experts to judge the reliability of systems or detect any but the simplest errors.

If the legal system and wider society are to have any confidence in computer evidence the providers of such evidence must be able to demonstrate that they are managing their systems responsibly. This was not the case at the Post Office and Fujitsu. Horizon was not subjected to a full, rigorous system audit. In 2010 senior Post Office management took a decision that Horizon would not be subjected to an independent review because;

No independent review was conducted until Second Sight was commissioned in 2012, and the contract was terminated abruptly. The Post Office have not offered any evidence that their own internal auditors conducted an appropriate system audit.

Investigative reporting
A BBC Radio 4 series about the scandal, The Great Post Office Trial, produced by Whistledown Productions, won two gold awards in the New York Festivals Radio Awards.

A book, The Great Post Office Scandal, written by Nick Wallis, was published by Bath Publishing in November 2021.

Individual cases 

 Jo Hamilton, from South Warnborough in Hampshire, claims she first noticed problems with the Horizon system in 2005 and lost £36,000; she pleaded guilty to false accounting after trying to hide the resulting incorrect deficit. She was originally charged with theft, but was told that if she repaid the money and pleaded guilty to 14 counts of false accounting, she would be less likely to go to prison. At the time, she was told that she was the only person who had had these problems. She pleaded guilty, and, under the terms of her contract, she paid her wages for the next ten months to Post Office Ltd, and had to remortgage her house to pay the money. James Arbuthnot, who later supported the SPMs, was her MP.
 Noel Thomas, a man who had worked for the Royal Mail for 42 years, spent his 60th birthday in prison as a result of the errors.
 Sarah Burgess Boyd, from Newcastle upon Tyne, said she lost her life savings in repaying an incorrect shortfall.
 Rubina Nami was jailed for 12 months in 2010 for false accounting of £43,000. She and her husband fell behind on mortgage payments and in February 2013 bailiffs seized their home and changed the locks. They slept in their van for six weeks before being given a one-bed social housing flat by the local council.
 Seema Misra was pregnant with her second child when she was convicted in 2010 of theft, and sentenced to 15 months jail. Misra told The Guardian that had she not been pregnant, she would have taken her own life. Local press reports at that time described her as the "pregnant thief" and her husband was physically attacked in the aftermath of her conviction. Misra has indicated that her ordeal was continual for the entire time period it took for the case to reach a resolution.
 There has been one documented suicide in connection with the affair.

See also
 Bates v Post Office Ltd (No 3)

References

Bibliography

External links

Official 
 Post Office Horizon Inquiry - official website
 
 Official finding of the April 2021 appeals, and summary

Third party 
 Paul Marshall. Text of speech to the University of Law on 3 June 2021
 
 Nick Wallis, Post Office Trial hearing-by-hearing reporting
 Nick Wallis, Post Office Scandal

Media 
 Trouble at the Post Office, BBC Panorama programme, broadcast 17 August 2015
 Second Class Citizens: The Post Office IT Scandal, File on 4: BBC Radio 4 documentary, broadcast 16 February 2020
 Justice Lost In The Post, Private Eye special report, May 2020
 The Great Post Office Trial, BBC Radio 4 documentary series, broadcast 25 May5 June 2020
 Scandal at the Post Office, BBC Panorama programme, broadcast 8 June 2020
 A First Class Scandal, File on 4: BBC Radio 4 documentary, broadcast 15 February 2022
 The Post Office Scandal, BBC Panorama programme, broadcast 25 April 2022
 Investigating the Post Office Scandal, Podcasts by Rebecca Thomson and Nick Wallis, 2022-23

Campaigning 
 Justice For Sub-postmasters Alliance Campaigning group. Site includes relevant documents.
 FoI requests by Alan Bates on behalf of JFSA, made via WhatDoTheyKnow under the Freedom of Information Act 2000

Wrongful conviction advocacy
Discovery (law)
Legal error
Overturned convictions in the United Kingdom
Human rights
Abuse of the legal system
Codes of criminal procedure
Postal system of the United Kingdom
Computer systems
Lawsuits
False confessions
English contract case law
Software_bugs
Fujitsu
Government by algorithm